Uraecha angusta is a species of beetle in the family Cerambycidae. It was described by Francis Polkinghorne Pascoe in 1856, originally under the genus Monohammus. It is known from Vietnam, China and Taiwan. It contains the varietas Uraecha angusta var. horishana.

U. angusta feeds on Cinnamomum camphora.

References

Lamiini
Beetles described in 1856